The official court uniform and dress of the Ottoman Empire were required to be worn by those in attendance at the imperial court in the nineteenth century, with the aim of being on the same line as most European nations. It consisted of European-inspired clothing in the Empire style. It was introduced during the early stages of the Tanzimat modernization period until the end of the First World War.

History 

The Tanzimat reforms emerged from the minds of reformist sultans like Mahmud II, his son Abdulmejid I and prominent, often European-educated bureaucrats, who recognised that the old religious and military institutions no longer met the needs of the empire. Most of the symbolic changes, such as uniforms, were aimed at changing the mindset of imperial administrators. Many of the officials affiliated with the government were encouraged to wear a more western style of dress. Many of the reforms were attempts to adopt successful European practices. The reforms were heavily influenced by the Napoleonic Code and French law under the Second French Empire as a direct result of the increasing number of Ottoman students being educated in France.

After the French military mission in 1796, French practices became very popular within Ottoman society. After the creation of the first cabinet, Mahmud II ordered several bureaucrats to the courts of France and other nations around the globe to observe not only clothing but also innovated institutions, which were acceptable for that era. The first new court uniforms were worn around 1839, the time of the sultan's death. His son Abdulmejid I succeeded him and French-style court uniform and dress were officially set. European-style clothing was also popular among the upper class, as redingotes, jackets, waistcoats, frock coats, ties, sharp-pointed and high-heeled shoes were not unusual during the Tanzimat modernization period.

Republican period 

After the abolition of the Ottoman monarchy, the white tie was introduced for all government officials including the president.

Gallery

Court uniforms 1839-1876

Court uniforms 1876-1922

References

Court uniforms and dress
Ottoman clothing
Ottoman court
Material culture of royal courts